Bhelowal (Urdu, Punjabi:   بھیلووال) is a village, union council, and administrative subdivision of Jhelum District (Urdu جہلم) in the Punjab Province of Pakistan. It is part of Pind Dadan Khan Tehsil. Bhelowal is located approximately 189 km south of Islamabad in Pakistan. The language spoken in Saroba Punjab is Punjabi with blend of many dialects such as wanhari and pothohari. Approximately 2,700 people reside in this town. Agriculture is the usual source of income.

References 

Populated places in Tehsil Pind Dadan Khan
Union councils of Pind Dadan Khan Tehsil